The Hum Awards pre-show (currently known as Hum Awards Red Carpet) and Making of Hum Awards are recorded televised pre-shows where former precedes the start of the Hum Awards telecast by 37 minutes and latter, two days prior to ceremony respectively. The pre-show takes place on the red carpet surrounding the theater which holds the telecast, and is almost always hosted by various media personalities, while making of award ceremony introduced the back stage performances, rehearsals, managements and making of stage of ceremony before the event. The latter event is not necessary to be recorded and shown every year.     

Red carpet of Hum Awards begin half an hour before the ceremony starts, it's include the interview and the welcome arrival of all the guests, nominees and others on the ceremony. While Making of Hum Awards usually held two days before the ceremony with running time of forty to forty five minutes. 1st Hum Awards Ceremony's red-carpet and making of ceremony was hosted by Sohai Ali Abro and Noor Hassan Rizvi at Expo Center, Karachi.

History
As of 1st Hum Awards the pre-show or red carpet is held half an hour or 45-minutes before the actual ceremony starts. As the red carpet and event went live without telecast for audience. 1st Hum Awards and Red carpet were both recorded as per the decision by Hum TV management team.

Title
Most recently it's known as the "Hum Awards Red Carpet", but it is also known as the Hum Awards pre-show, but more acknowledgedly it is known as Red Carpet.

Hosts of Pre-shows

 Red-Carpet   
The pre-show usually employs the use of recent TV or media personalities as the hosts, who interview the nominees and attendees and sometimes introduce special segments in the moments preceding the ceremony. 
 Making of Ceremony
As per of 1st Hum Awards there is a special 30 minute program, which shows the making of Award Ceremony, for example; Stage making, Awards presentations, interviews of management head etc. For 1st Hum awards the making of ceremony televised at 7: 25 pm on April 26, 2013, 2 days before the actual event, as per event or red carpet this program was also recorded at televised two days before actual event and one day before red carpet event. The event is not neccassry to be shown every year. 

Mostly the hosts of Red-carpet and Making of ceremony are same, following is the listing of  hosts of the pre-show since the 1st Hum Awards ceremony held in 2013:

 2013

 Noor Hassan Rizvi
 Sohai Ali Abro

 2014

 Anoushey Ashraf
 Mansha Pasha

 2015

 Mohsin Abbas Haider
 Anoushey Ashraf

 2016

 Khalid Malik 
 Rubya Chaudhry

See also
 List of Hum Awards Ceremonies

References

External links
Official websites
 Hum Awards official website
Other resources
 

Hum Awards